Klaserie Game Reserve is adjacent to the Kruger Park and the Timbavati Game Reserve, in the Limpopo province of South Africa. It has an area of about 60,000 ha and the Klaserie River runs through the park.

Wildlife 
Wildlife species include lion, elephant, white rhino, leopard, cheetah, African wild dog, spotted hyena, buffalo and many antelope species.

See also 
 Protected areas of South Africa

Nature reserves in South Africa